The Malaysian Chess Federation (MCF) is the principal authority over all chess events in Malaysia and organizes the Malaysian Chess Championship. The MCF promotes and coordinates all major chess events in the 13 Malaysian states and is an active sports body in Malaysia. The Federation is affiliated to the world governing body, FIDE, and is part of the ASEAN Chess Confederation.

External links
 

Malaysia
Chess in Malaysia
Chess
1975 establishments in Malaysia
Sports organizations established in 1975
Chess organizations
1975 in chess